The Långaryd family is one of the largest documented families in the world, according to Guinness World Records (the current world-record holder being the descendants of Confucius). It was noted twice in the Guinness World Records, both for most known relatives (1988) and the largest family reunion (2500 people in 1991, now replaced by another record holder).

The family descended from the churchwarden  Nils Andersson (Ackerman) (1620–1717) and his wife Börta (a local variant of Brita) (around 1631-1705) from Våthult in the current Hylte municipality (in southwest Sweden) and includes (unlike the usual) all descendants of him to both male as female part, including some adopted and foster children. The origin of name is that they originally started from Anders Jönsson (1662–1716) who lived in Långaryd the current Gislaved.

Status 2006 
As of 2006 the family has 149,000 registered members (including by marriage). 100,000 are directly descendant from Anders Jönsson. 111,500 are still alive (76,000 of them direct descendant). 99,000 live in Sweden. 9,000 live in the US. The family makes up 1.1% of the population of Sweden. The only municipality in Sweden they are not represented in is Bjurholm. The family is represented in 48 of 50 states in the US (Delaware and Mississippi missing). The family lives in 60 countries in all continents.

Famous members

Royalty
 Ferdinand of Liechtenstein (by marriage)
 Hanno von Liechtenstein
 Andreas von Liechtenstein
 Max von Liechtenstein
 Evalena Worthington

Politics
 Björn Rosengren (s) - former minister of finance (by marriage)
 Jörgen Andersson (s) - former minister of interior and minister of housing
 count Carl B. Hamilton (fp) - professor of economics and member of parliament
 Jan Nygren (s) - former minister (by marriage)
 Mikael Odenberg (m) - former minister of defence

Government
 Sven-Olof Petersson - ambassadeur to EU
 Louise Sylwander (born Nordenskiöld)

Religion
 Carl Block - bishop of Göteborg
 John Cullberg - biskop of Västerås
 Christina Odenberg - biskop of Lund
 John Bendix - bishop in US Methodism
 Abd al Haqq Kielan - imam and leader of the Muslims in Sweden (by marriage)

Science
 Hans-Uno Bengtsson - physics at Lunds universitet
 Bodil Jönsson - physics, author. Active at Lunds universitet

Music
 Joakim Thåström - known from Ebba Grön and Imperiet
 Titiyo Jah - singer
 Magnus Carlsson - singer in Barbados and Alcazar
 Daniel Bellqvist - singer in Eskobar
 William Lind - band leader
 Wollmar Sandell - pianist

Theater and movies
 Inga Landgré - actor
 Nils Poppe - comic and actor (by marriage)
 Torsten Wahlund - actor (by marriage)
 Andreas Wilson- actor
 Ronny Danielsson - director

Art and design
 Erland Cullberg - artist
 Hardy Strid - artist
 Claes Bondelid - fashion designer (co-living with a family member)
 Lars Danielsson - artist
 Kristoffer Akselbo - artist, MFA
 Robert Magnusson - Webdesigner

Literature
 Göran Sonnevi - author

Mass media
 Sigurd Glans - Aftonbladet
 Maria Schottenius - Dagens Nyheter
 Olle Svenning - journalist and author (by marriage)
 Lars Madsén - radio reporter (by marriage)
 Siewert Öholm - TV producer (by marriage)

Finance
 Carl Jehander - railway constructor (built 2000 km), engineer, industrialist and member of parliament
 Vincent Bendix - from Chicago, inventor of the self-starting automobile
 Åke Nordlander - executive director of  Sveriges verkstadsförening
 Johan Staël von Holstein - entrepreneur

Sport
 Mats Jingblad - football coach
 Glenn Hysén - football player (by marriage)
 Tobias Hysén - football player, son of Glenn Hysén
 Johan Mjällby - football player (by marriage)
 Michael Svensson - football player
 Christian Wilhelmsson - football player
 Ulf "Tickan" Carlsson - table tennis player
 Peter Karlsson - table tennis player (by marriage)

Books

External links
Långarydssläkten, official page

Swedish families